Charles Thomas Ovenden (11 September 1846 – 9 July 1924) was an Irish Anglican priest, author, and Dean of St. Patrick's Cathedral, Dublin of the Church of Ireland.

Early life and education 
Born in Enniskillen, Northern Ireland  he was educated at the Portora Royal School, Enniskillen  and Trinity College, Dublin.

Career 
Ordained in 1870, his first position was as a curate at Magdalene Church, Belfast. Later he was Rector of Dunluce, County Antrim and then Succentor at St Patrick's Cathedral, Dublin. He was Rector of Portrush from 1884 to 1886 when he became Precentor of Clogher. In 1903 he became Dean of Clogher before moving to Dublin in 1911. 

During World War I he protested the German submarine actions and while the Dean of St. Patrick's Church was quoted by The Telegraph as saying that he prays with all heart "that [the German] knavish tricks might be confounded".

Personal life 
He married Isabella Mary Ovenden (née Robinson) in 1871. Their daughters were paediatrician Isabella (‘Ella’) Gertrude Amy Webb (16 October 1877–1946) and Florence Irene Harriet Wynne-Finch (née Ovenden). They raised Charles Ovenden's niece, confusingly also named Isabella Gertrude Webb but born 28 October 1877. The later child's parents, William Henry (Charles' brother) and Edith Ovenden née Lamb, fought contentious divorce and custody proceedings in New Zealand, as a result of which a judge placed Webb's cousin in the custody of Charles and Isabella in Ireland.

References

External links

 

1846 births
People from Enniskillen
People educated at Portora Royal School
Alumni of Trinity College Dublin
Irish Anglicans
Deans of St. Patrick's Cathedral, Dublin
1924 deaths
Deans of Clogher
People from Howth